Scott Downing (born November 7, 1956) is an American football player and coach.  He is currently the vice president of athletics at Sterling College.

Playing history
Downing played college football at Sterling College in Sterling, Kansas as an offensive lineman and punter.  He was team captain for the 1977 and 1978 seasons and was a letterman for all four years he played.

Coaching career

Sterling
After working as an assistant coach for his alma mater, Downing became the head football coach for Sterling in his first head coaching job.  He held the position for the 1982 and 1983 seasons.  His coaching record at Sterling was 13–4–1.

Northern Colorado
Downing was the head coach at the University of Northern Colorado in Greeley for five years, from 2006 to 2010.  After five seasons, his teams had managed only 9 wins to 47 losses.

Head coaching record

References

External links
Sterling profile

1956 births
Living people
Liberty Flames football coaches
Nebraska Cornhuskers football coaches
Northern Colorado Bears football coaches
Purdue Boilermakers football coaches
Sterling Warriors football coaches
Tulsa Golden Hurricane football coaches
Toronto Argonauts coaches
Wyoming Cowboys football coaches